The Blue-Raman cable system is a proposed intercontinental fibre-optic communications cable system what will connect France to India via Italy, Greece, Israel, Jordan, Saudi Arabia, Djibouti, and Oman. It is notable in that it avoids passing through Egypt, a country which is widely regarded as a chokepoint for Internet connectivity. Google is a major investor in the system. 

The Mediterranean submarine section of the system is named Blue, and the eastern submarine section which passes through the Red Sea and Arabian Sea is named Raman after the physicist C. V. Raman. Parts of the Blue segment of the system are shared with the SeaMed submarine cable system. The Blue and Raman systems will be linked overland to complete the system.

THe Blue-Raman system was announced in 2021, and is intended to be in service in 2024.

References

External links 
 Map of "Blue" segment on submarinecablemap.com
 Map of "Raman" segment on submarinecablemap.com

Submarine communications cables
Submarine communications cables in the Mediterranean Sea
Submarine communications cables in the Red Sea
Submarine communications cables in the Arabian Sea